Joshua Evans is the name of:

 Joshua Evans (Quaker minister) (1731–1798), Quaker minister from New Jersey
 Joshua Evans Jr. (1777–1846), United States Congressman from Pennsylvania
 Joshua Evans (Tennessee politician) (born 1983), member of the Tennessee House of Representatives
 Josh Ryan Evans (1982–2002), American actor
 Josh Evans (film producer) (born 1971), American filmmaker, screenwriter, author and actor
 Josh Evans (defensive lineman) (1972–2021), American football player
 Josh Evans (defensive back) (born 1991), American football player
 Josh Evans, fictitious persona used to harass Megan Meier, see Suicide of Megan Meier